The Columbia Hills are an area of hills and small mountains along the north bank of the Columbia River in Klickitat County, in south-central Washington (state), USA.

Columbia Hills Historical State Park

Columbia Hills Historical State Park lies in the Columbia Hills. It includes Horsethief Lake (a reservoir made by The Dalles Dam). Camping is allowed. It has  of freshwater shoreline on the Columbia River.

References

Parks in Klickitat County, Washington
State parks of Washington (state)
Landforms of Klickitat County, Washington